This is a complete list of all cities and towns in Bulgaria sorted by population. Province capitals are shown in bold. Primary sources are the National Statistical Institute (NSI) and the Bulgarian Academy of Sciences.

The largest city is Sofia with about 1.3 million inhabitants and the smallest is Melnik with about 300. Smallest towns are not necessarily larger than all villages as many villages are more populous than many towns, compare Lozen, a large village with more than 6,000 inhabitants.

List

See also

List of villages in Bulgaria
Nomenclature of Territorial Units for Statistics (NUTS) of Bulgaria
List of cities in the European Union by population within city limits
List of European cities by population within city limits

References

External links

 Map main cities in Bulgaria at Visitmybulgaria.com
 Map of Bulgarian towns at BGMaps.com
 
 Maps of Bulgarian towns at Domino.bg 
 Veliko Tarnovo of Bulgaria

 
Cities
Bulgaria, List of cities in
Bulgaria, List of cities in